"@ MEH" (stylized in all caps; pronounced "at me") is a song by American rapper Playboi Carti, released on April 16, 2020. It was released in promotion for Carti's second studio album Whole Lotta Red; however, it was excluded from the project's final tracklist. The song was produced by JetsonMade, Neeko Baby and Deskhop.

Critical reception
Charles Holmes of Rolling Stone writes that "'@ MEH' sounds like a Fisher-Price Fruity Loops jamboree as performed by a PlayStation 4." In a high-pitched "baby voice", Carti sings about everything he hates about "pussy ass niggas."

Music video
The music video for "@ MEH" debuted on the same day as the song's release, and was directed by Carter himself and Nick Walker.

Personnel
Credits adapted from Tidal.

 Jordan Carter – composer
 DeskHop – producer, composer
 JetsonMade – producer, composer
 Neeko Baby – producer, composer
 Colin Leonard – mastering engineer
 Roark Bailey – mixer, recording engineer

Charts

References

2020 singles
2020 songs
Interscope Records singles
Songs written by Playboi Carti
Playboi Carti songs